The annual NCAA women's ice hockey tournament—officially known as the National Collegiate Women's Ice Hockey Championship—is a college ice hockey tournament held in the United States by the National Collegiate Athletic Association to determine the top women's team in the NCAA. The 2020 championship was canceled due to the COVID-19 pandemic.

Unlike most NCAA sports, women's ice hockey uses a modified version of the National Collegiate championship format, which means Division I and Division II teams compete against each other in the same tournament.

Origins
The NCAA championship of women's ice hockey began in 2001, although several universities had had women's teams established since the early 1970s.

In 1965, the first collegiate women's ice hockey team in the United States was created at Brown University. In February 1966, the team, named the "Pembroke Pandas", played its first match. Their opponents were the Walpole Brooms, a non-collegiate team. The women's ice hockey program of Cornell University began in 1971. The Big Red team competed in its first match in 1972, which it won 4–3, against Scarborough. In 1972, they played eight matches and lost half, including two defeats against the Pembroke Pandas. Yale University made its debut in women's hockey on December 9, 1975. The University of Minnesota-Duluth, the University of New Hampshire, and the rest of the Ivy League schools have similar histories.

In 1976, Brown University would host the first ever Ivy League women's ice hockey tournament. Competitors in the tournament included Princeton, Yale, and Cornell, which won the tournament. Women's ice hockey continued growth and acceptance continued through the early 1980s. In 1984, the Providence Friars won the inaugural ECAC women's ice hockey championship.

In the 1997–98 season, the American Women's College Hockey Alliance (AWCHA) made its debut. It was financed by the United States Olympic Committee. This allowed for the first national women's ice hockey championship to occur, which was won by New Hampshire. The 1997–98 season also saw the creation of the Patty Kazmaier Award, designed to recognize the most remarkable women's collegiate ice hockey player every season. The AWCHA also conducted championships in 1999 and 2000, which were won by Harvard and Minnesota respectively.

During the 1999–2000 season, WCHA joined the ECAC in an attempt to make women's ice hockey an NCAA sanctioned sport. In August 2000, the NCAA announced that it would set up a national division of women's ice hockey with a national championship at the end of every season, starting with the 2000–01 season. The Minnesota–Duluth Bulldogs won the inaugural tournament defeating the St. Lawrence Skating Saints 4-2 in the championship game.

NCAA Division I women's ice hockey

In all, 41 schools in the United States, ranging from the Midwest to the East Coast, sponsor varsity women's hockey at the National Collegiate (Divisions I and II) level. Five National Collegiate conferences are currently recognized by the NCAA—College Hockey America, ECAC Hockey, Hockey East, New England Women's Hockey Alliance, and the Western Collegiate Hockey Association.

Format
Under NCAA rules, Division II schools are allowed to compete as Division I members in sports in which a D-II championship is not contested. As there is no Division II championship for women's ice hockey, this rule applies to the tournament. The official name of the "Division I" tournament is the National Collegiate Women's Ice Hockey Championship, which reflects the NCAA's formal terminology for championship events that are open to schools from multiple divisions.

This tournament is a single elimination competition of eleven teams. The semi-finals and finals are called the "Women's Frozen Four." This moniker is similar to the name used by the NCAA Men's Ice Hockey Championship. The term is derived from the term "Final four."

The Patty Kazmaier Award ceremony takes place annually during Women's Frozen Four weekend.

History
Although many schools from many conferences have been competitive, the first 13 championships were won by only three different schools all originating from the WCHA: Minnesota-Duluth, Minnesota, and Wisconsin. In 2014, the WCHA's hold on the championship was finally broken when Clarkson defeated Minnesota. In 2022, Ohio State won the national championship, making them the 4th WCHA team to win. The ECAC, from which Clarkson originated, has easily been the second most competitive conference, with eleven appearances in ten national title games, including the first five games. Hockey East has had four title game appearances, twice by Boston University and once each by Boston College and Northeastern, and CHA has had one title appearance, by Mercyhurst in 2009. The 2020 championship was cancelled due to the COVID-19 pandemic.

Team titles

Result by school and year
NCAA Division I Women's Hockey Tournament appearances by school

25 teams have appeared in the NCAA Tournament in at least one year starting with 2001 (the initial year that the post-season tournament was under the auspices of the NCAA). The results for all years are shown in this table below.

The code in each cell represents the furthest the team made it in the respective tournament:

  First Round (did not exist until 2022)
  Quarterfinals (did not exist until 2005)
  Frozen Four
  National Runner-up
  National Champion
  Announced as a participant in the 2020 tournament before it was canceled

Broadcasting 
In February 2017, the NCAA announced that it had reached a four-year deal with Big Ten Network to televise the Women's national championship game beginning in 2017, and the Frozen Four semi-finals beginning in 2018.

In 2021, ESPN announced that it had acquired the rights under a multi-year deal, with ESPNU to air one semi-final and the national championship annually. The other semi-final will be carried via streaming.

Records and statistics
NCAA Division I Women's Hockey Tournament all-time individual records
NCAA Division I Women's Hockey Tournament all-time team records

See also

Patty Kazmaier Award
Laura Hurd Award
NCAA Division III women's ice hockey tournament
Title IX
NCAA Men's Ice Hockey Championship
Pre-NCAA Women's Ice Hockey Champions

References

College women's ice hockey in the United States
3